Veliš is name of several locations in the Czech Republic:
Veliš (Benešov District)
Veliš (Jičín District)